The 2016 Washington gubernatorial election was held on November 8, 2016.

Under Washington's top-two primary law, all candidates appear on the same ballot, regardless of party. In the August 2 primary, residents voted for one of several candidates from a range of party affiliations. The top two finishers, incumbent governor Jay Inslee (Democratic) and Port of Seattle Commissioner Bill Bryant (Republican), moved on to the November general election, which Inslee won. , this was the last gubernatorial election in Washington in which the margin of victory was within single digits.

Background
Democratic governor Christine Gregoire declined to seek a third term in 2012. Democratic former U.S. Representative Jay Inslee was elected to succeed her, defeating Republican Rob McKenna, the outgoing Attorney General of Washington, by 51.4% to 48.3%. The last Republican to hold the office of governor was John Spellman in 1985, meaning that Washington has the second longest period (South Dakota has not had a Democratic governor since 1979) of one-party statehouse rule in America.

Primary election

Democratic Party

Declared
 James Robert Deal
 Johnathan Dodds
 Jay Inslee, incumbent governor
 Patrick O'Rourke

Republican Party

Declared
 Bill Bryant, former Seattle Port Commissioner
 Goodspaceguy, perennial candidate
 Bill Hirt

Declined
 Andy Hill, state senator
 Steve Litzow, state senator (running for reelection)
 Rob McKenna, former Attorney General of Washington and nominee for governor in 2012
 Dave Reichert, U.S. Representative for Washington's 8th congressional district (running for reelection)

Third Party and independent candidates

Declared
 David Blomstrom (Fifth Republic)
 Christian Joubert (Holistic)
 Mary Martin (Socialist Workers)
 Steve Rubenstein (Independent)

Declined
 Randy Dorn, State Superintendent of Public Instruction

Polling

with Inslee, Bryant, and Dorn

Results

General election

Debates
Complete video of debate, October 19, 2016 - C-SPAN

Predictions

Endorsements

Polling
Aggregate polls

Jay Inslee vs. Andy Hill

Jay Inslee vs. Rob McKenna

Jay Inslee vs. Dave Reichert

Jay Inslee vs. generic Republican

Jay Inslee vs. generic opponent

Generic Democrat vs. generic Republican

Results

Results by county

Counties that flipped from Democratic to Republican 
Grays Harbor (largest city: Aberdeen)
Pacific (largest city: Raymond)

Counties that flipped from Republican to Democratic 
Island (largest city: Oak Harbor)
Kitsap (largest city: Bremerton)
Pierce (largest city: Tacoma)

By congressional district
Inslee won 6 of 10 congressional districts.

Notes

References

External links
Official campaign websites (Archived)
David Blomstrom (FR) for Governor
Patrick O'Rourke (D) for Governor
Jay Inslee (D) for Governor
Bill Bryant (R) for Governor
James Robert Deal (D) for Governor

Washington
Governor
Jay Inslee
2016